Kavieng Airport  is located in Kavieng, New Ireland, Papua New Guinea and is located approximately 1 km away from the town centre.

Originally constructed by Australian Commandos as a single runway, it was later taken and occupied by the Japanese on 23 Jan 1942, going on to expand and improve it. The airbase was regularly bombed by the Americans throughout 1943–44, the Japanese continued to actively use the airbase until 1944.

After the end of the war, it was converted to civilian use, and now possesses a modern, though small terminal facility.

On 17 Jun, 2016 an agreement was signed with the New Ireland Provincial Government to initiate the Kavieng Airport Project, intended to upgrade the  site to an International Airport. To do this the existing runway will be extended 3.4m in width and 365.67m in length to meet international standards.

Airlines and destinations

References

Airports in Papua New Guinea
New Ireland Province